Oscar Muñoz (born 28 November 1964, Medellín, Colombia) is an Olympic wrestler. He took part in the 1988 Summer Olympics in Seoul, South Korea, competing in the 52 kg freestyle wrestling event. He failed to progress from the group stage.

External links
 

1964 births
Living people
Sportspeople from Medellín
Colombian male sport wrestlers
Wrestlers at the 1988 Summer Olympics
Olympic wrestlers of Colombia
20th-century Colombian people